Dhandadihi is a village in Andal CD Block of Durgapur subdivision in Paschim Bardhaman district  in the state of West Bengal, India.

Geography

Demographics
 India census, Dhandadihi had a population of 3,843. Males constitute 55% of the population and females 45%. Dhandadihi has an average literacy rate of 64%, higher than the national average of 59.5%: male literacy is 70% and, female literacy is 56%. In Dhandadihi, 10% of the population is under 6 years of age.

Education
Dhandadihi has one primary school.

References

Villages in Paschim Bardhaman district